Valley of the Redwoods is a 1960 American Western film directed by William Witney, written by Leo Gordon and Daniel Madison, and starring John Hudson, Lynette Bernay, Ed Nelson, Michael Forest, Robert Shayne and John Brinkley. It was released on May 8, 1960, by 20th Century Fox.

Plot

Cast 
John Hudson as Wayne Randall
Lynette Bernay as Jan Spencer 
Ed Nelson as Dino Michaelis
Michael Forest as Dave Harris
Robert Shayne as Capt. Sid Walker
John Brinkley as Willie Chadwick 
Bruno VeSota as Joe Wolcheck
Hal Torey as Philip Blair
Chris Miller as Charlotte Walker

Production
Filming started December 1959.

Reception
Gene Corman says that Fox head of production Buddy Adler "particularly liked" the film. It was one of Corman's personal favorites of the films he made.

References

External links 
 

1960 films
20th Century Fox films
CinemaScope films
American Western (genre) films
1960 Western (genre) films
Films directed by William Witney
1960s English-language films
1960s American films